Pauia is a monotypic genus of flowering plants belonging to the family Solanaceae. It only contains one known species, Pauia belladonna Deb & Ratna Dutta 

It is native to the state of Arunachal Pradesh in the Eastern Himalaya in India.

The genus name of Pauia is in honour of Hermenegild Santapau (1903–1970), a Spanish born naturalized Indian Jesuit priest and botanist,. The Latin specific epithet of belladonna refers Atropa belladonna (or commonly known as 'deadly nightshade'), another Solanaceae family member.
Both the genus and the species were first described and published in Indian Forester Vol.91 on page 363 in 1965.

References

Solanaceae
Solanaceae genera
Plants described in 1965
Flora of Arunachal Pradesh